West Holmes High School is a public high school in Monroe Township, approximately  west of Millersburg, Ohio. It holds grades 9–12. It is one of only two public high schools in Holmes County.

Curriculum
West Holmes High School is one of many public schools in the United States offering Advanced Placement (AP) courses from the College Board. West Holmes High School currently offers five AP courses: AP Biology, AP Calculus (AB), AP Spanish Language, AP English Literature and Composition, and AP German.

Athletics
West Holmes competes in the Ohio High School Athletic Association (OHSAA) as a member of the Ohio Cardinal Conference. West Holmes has two big rivals, Triway High School in all sports, and Hiland High School in all sports except for football and wrestling as Hiland High School does not participate in contact sports. The West Holmes girls basketball team holds the Ohio state record for consecutive wins with 108, a winning streak that spanned four years from 1983 to 1987 and included three consecutive state championships.

State championships
Girls basketball – 1984, 1985, 1986, 2014

Notable alumni
Joe Norman — professional American football linebacker in the National Football League. He played five seasons for the Seattle Seahawks.
Max Rohskopf — professional American mixed martial artists competing in the Ultimate Fighting Championship.

References

External links
 

High schools in Holmes County, Ohio
Public high schools in Ohio